The pileus is the technical name for the cap, or cap-like part, of a basidiocarp or ascocarp (fungal fruiting body) that supports a spore-bearing surface, the hymenium. The hymenium (hymenophore) may consist of lamellae, tubes, or teeth, on the underside of the pileus. A pileus is characteristic of agarics, boletes, some polypores, tooth fungi, and some ascomycetes.

Classification
Pilei can be formed in various shapes, and the shapes can change over the course of the developmental cycle of a fungus. The most familiar pileus shape is hemispherical or convex. Convex pilei often continue to expand as they mature until they become flat. Many well-known species have a convex pileus, including the button mushroom, various Amanita species and boletes.

Some, such as the parasol mushroom, have distinct bosses or umbos and are described as umbonate. An umbo is a knobby protrusion at the center of the cap. Some fungi, such as chanterelles have a funnel- or trumpet-shaped appearance. In these cases the pileus is termed infundibuliform.

See also

Lamella
Stipe

Notes

References
Arora, D: "Mushrooms Demystified", Ten Speed Press, 1986.

Fungal morphology and anatomy
Mycology

ja:キノコの部位#傘